The haciendas in the Valley of Ameca comprise a series of expansive land estates awarded to Spanish soldiers for their services in the military during the conquest of New Spain in the late 1500s.  Although a great portion of these estates were built during the colonial period (1701-1821), some of them were inclusively built during the Porfirian period (1876-1910). These haciendas served as religious centers in their respective vicinities, most included capilla, or chapel, with its campanario.

These land estates were dedicated to farm labor, most in the production of mezcal, a wine made from agave plant. Other crops grown were sugar cane and rice; and livestock was also an important profit.

All located in central Jalisco, Mexico; many of the haciendas have grown into communities and are now partly damaged, in ruins, or have been remodeled.

A total of 21 haciendas settled in the Valley of Ameca helped the local flourishment. 13 of these haciendas belong to the Ameca, 3 to San Martín de Hidalgo, 2 to Cocula, and 3 to Tala.

Haciendas

in alphabetical order
Hacienda Buenavista de Cañedo 
Hacienda Cofradía de la Luz
Hacienda Cuisillos
Hacienda El Cabezón founded in 1578
Hacienda El Cuis
Hacienda El Portezuelo 
Hacienda Labor de Medina
Hacienda Labor de Solís
Hacienda La Esperanza founded in 1710
Hacienda La Higuera
Hacienda La Sauceda 
Hacienda La Villita
Hacienda San Antonio Matute founded in 1749 
Hacienda San Ignacio
Hacienda Jayamitla
Hacienda San Juan de los Arcos
Hacienda San José del Refugio
Hacienda San José de Miravalle founded in 1870
Hacienda San Miguel
Hacienda San Nicolás
Hacienda Santa María de la Huerta founded in 1573

References

Valley of Ameca
Colonial Mexico